Ben Elton: The Man from Auntie is a British television comedy series written and performed by Ben Elton. The title of the series was a play on words of the American spy series The Man from U.N.C.L.E., and "Auntie", an informal name for the BBC.

The first series aired on BBC1 in 1990. A second series with a slightly different format was aired four years later in 1994.

The series was primarily based on Elton's stand-up comedy routines, with his monologues interspersed with occasional filmed sketches and parodies, as well as soundbites from chinface "potato heads". Another regular segment were "Farties' Guides" to such tasks as catching a train or setting up home—Elton described "Farties" as "you and me"—ordinary people endeavouring to make it through life despite the efforts of entities such as the "body conspiracy" and the Ministry of Crap Design.

References

External links

BBC television comedy
1990 British television series debuts
1994 British television series endings
1990s British comedy television series
British stand-up comedy television series
English-language television shows
Television shows written by Ben Elton
Television series created by Ben Elton